The Philippine All-Stars is a Filipino Hip-hop dance group from the Philippines. They won the 2006 and 2008 World Hip Hop Dance Championships. Hip-hop community viewed All-Star as one of the most jaw-dropping crews that ever exist. They were formed on 2005 by twelve individuals that were working in the Manila underground Hip-hop scene. They also joined the “Artists Revolution: 365 days to change” campaign which asks the Filipino voters to be more critical in choosing their political leaders in the coming 2010 elections. This Group set the high Standard of Dancing in the Philippines and gave the young dancers hope and inspirations.

History
The Philippine Allstars was started in 2005 by Twelve friends who wanted to collectively represent their country in the World Hip-Hop Championships held in the US. That year after taking first in the Maximum Groovity II, National Hip-Hop Open, they proudly placed sixth in the World. In 2006, Allstars put the Philippines on the map of Hip-hop dance in becoming the first Asian country to win back-to-back World Gold titles in the International Hip-hop Open d’Ítalia in Turin, Italy and in the World Hip-Hop Dance Championships in Los Angeles, California. The next year, the group took Bronze in the same competition and also won Team of the Year from V.Ent’s First Annual Dance Awards. Now in 2008, they came back strong again and took Gold with their 2008 iconic and legendary routine in the World Hip-Hop Dance Championships held in Las Vegas,they also won the Grand Champion in the Malta Guinness Street Dance Competition, Kenya, Africa, and in the same year won 1st Runner Up, UDO World Street Dancing Championships, Blackpoll, United Kingdom.  
The group hopes to elevate the status of dancers in the Philippines, because for too long have dancers been considered second-rate performers. Through their efforts and many talented others, they want to show that dancing is a great art form and should be more respected and rewarded than what is currently being offered by the entertainment industry. They share in a movement that strives to unite and inspire this generation through Faith, Hip-hop, and One Love. Lastly, a goal of the group is to teach and help under-privileged kids through dancing and inspiring them to strive for something more than what they have been told they can achieve. The Allstars advocates for Gawad Kalinga, has taught in US Embassy Outreach Programs, has spoken and performed for the QC Detention Cell, and participated in programs such as Pathways Workshop and Walk for Education. The Allstars are featured in many events, concerts, tours, TV guestings, commercials, music videos, films, and print ads.

In February 2010, they opened their first dance school, the Allstars Dance School, located in San Juan city Philippines.
The dance school is the realization of the Allstars' ultimate goal, and is their greatest achievement to date.

Each member contributes to its authentic Hip-Hop flavor that combines the different styles of Break-dancing, Krumping and Freestyle. Each members contributes to its authentic Hip-Hop flava that combines the different styles of Popping, Locking, Break-dancing, Krumping, Freestyling, House and other Old and New Skool genres. Other talents the members possess are Painting, Singing, Music Production, Commercial Styling, Hosting, Acting, Film Production, Graphic Design, and Writing

The original founding members are:

Kenjhons Serrano
Chelo Aestrid
Maya Carandang
Michelle "Tzy" Salazar
Jhong Mesina
Reagan Cornelio
Lema Diaz 
Kyxz Mendiola 
Patrick Caballa
Eye Vee Lobrin
Sheena Vera Cruz
Laurence Chua

Others:
Prince Paltu-Ob
Madelle Enriquez
Niko Bolante
Deo Bantillo
Vince Mendoza
Naomi Tamayo
Heidi Riego 
Krista Roma
Catherine Sabayle
Ac Lalata 
Rycher Alfonso 
Boh Valdez
Matthew Padilla
Orwayne de Leon 
Franco Hernandez

ACHIEVEMENTS:

2006 Hiphop Open Italy (CHAMPION)2006 World Hip Hop Dance Championship (CHAMPION)2007 World Hip Hop Dance Championship (BRONZE)2008 World Hip Hop Dance Championship (CHAMPION) 2009 World Hip Hop Dance Championship (FINALIST) 2009 Kenya Street Dance Africa (CHAMPION) 2009 UDO World Street Dancing Championships, Blackpoll, United Kingdom (1st Runner Up)  2010 TRI ASIA Competition (CHAMPION) 2011 Dance2Dance Switzerland (CHAMPION)

 2013 World Hiphop Dance Championships (FINALIST) 2013 World of Dance Bay Area (BRONZE)

Major Endorsement:

 Smart Bro (2010)
 Nestea Fit (2009)

Major Events/Gigs/Concerts:
 Lea Salonga - Your Songs Concert (2009-2010)
 Front Act (with Q-York), Pussycat Dolls Concert (June2009)
 365 Days To Change, Music Museum (May2009)
 Lovapalooza, MOA Open Field (Feb2007)
 Adidas Philippines MVP Night, Bellevue Hotel (June2006)
 Hip Hop Awards (2006, 2007)

TV Guestings, interviews, features:

 Showtime (2010)
 ASAP (2010)
 ASAP '09 (March/April 2009)
 Proudly Filipino, QTV11 (Oct 2008)
 America's Best Dance Crew (Performance for Live Audience) (Aug 2008)
 Rated K, ABS-CBN (June2008)
 Wowowee (June2008)
 Sharon (May2008)
 Boy & Kris
 ABS-CBN Summer Team Kapamilya Station ID (Mar2008)
 (2005-2007) TFC Bravura, Sports Unlimited, TV Patrol, Kay Gandang Umaga, Life @ ANC, Mornings @ ANC, 700Club Asia, 100% Pinoy, Unang Hirit, Homeboy, ASAP, GroopieTV, E-TV, Eat Bulaga, SOP, Master Showman, Urban MYX, Star MYX, MTV Jukebox

ALLSTARS concerts and events

 Beyond Hip Hop, SM Amphitheater, Pampanga (Jan 2009)
 Hip Hop Generation, Clarke Quay Arena, Singapore (Sept 2008)
 Choreographer's Birth, Irwin Theater, Ateneo (June2008)
 Beyond Hip Hop, Balara, Bataan (2008)
 Beyond Hip Hop in San Diego, National City, CA (Aug2007)
 Allstars Anniversary/Dance Battle, Ratsky's Morato (June2007)
 Allstars Studded Night: The Send-Off Party, Embassy Superclub (July2007)
 Beyond Hip Hop: The Repeat, Metrobar (July2007)
 Beyond Hip Hop, Metrobar (June2007)

References

Filipino dance groups
Performing groups established in 2005
2005 establishments in the Philippines